Come with Us is the fourth studio album by English electronic music duo the Chemical Brothers, released in January 2002 by record labels Virgin and Freestyle Dust in the UK and Astralwerks and Ultra in the US. It features Richard Ashcroft (ex-The Verve) and Beth Orton as guest vocalists.

The album debuted at number one on the UK Albums Chart. It was certified Gold by the BPI on 1 February 2002.

Background
The band's second and third albums Dig Your Own Hole and Surrender brought the band international fame. The band had a worldwide tour for Surrender beginning in 1999, continuing until summer 2000 when they played festivals including performances at Glastonbury Festival and Creamfields.

Following the festivals, the band created a new track, premiered in December 2000 when the band supported U2. Tom Rowlands seemed to initially have mixed feelings about the track, saying it had "quite a lot of percussion, big, sweeping sort of stuff. Live conga playing, quite spaced out. It's like Body & Soul, but really, really hard and twisted, it's like high-impact, full-on, but with more organic sounds, and quite intense, without the good vibe." The track was popular with fans, however, and eventually was released as the white label release "Electronic Battle Weapon 5" in June 2001. In the release's dawn, the duo had begun recording a new album, and the track had proved basis for the band's recording of the album.

Recording
Work for the album began in 2000, when it was initially titled Chemical Four. The album explores new gear such as the Parker MIDI Fly guitar. When asked about if the album is a "back-to-roots" album following their change in style for Surrender three years previous, Ed Simons said "The first three or four numbers do remind me of those days when we were so excited about putting together little grooves and beats – that whole cut-up era of hip-hop. We had Grand Wizard Theodore DJing at our gigs then. Like that scratch segment in 'Afrika', those tiny segments where it sounds like a DJ cutting in, those sorts of things used to really excite us. But some of the music is totally removed from that. 'Hoops' is totally different than anything we – or anyone – have ever done". The album took eighteen months to record.

In making the album, the string arpeggios and the hard MIDI notes came first. "Then it was about finding the right sounds and building from that point", says Simons. The band worked from 12:00pm to 12:00am each day making the album. The album's drum programming started with doing the snare sound, then a kick sound, and a bit of "high-end ssshhhhhh". The duo said they "took the actual individual drum sounds, then wrote the chords. We always sample tiny fragments of sound as a starting point. But there were more definite tunes and ideas and melodies from the start of this album than before". The duo also experimented with Emagic Logic Audio on this album, which proved successful in the album's production as it never crashed, unlike Steinberg Cubase, which the band had used previously.

Release
In the month of release the band had been given retrospective respect from magazines like Muzik Magazine. Promotion for the album started in September 2001, and somewhat concluded in November 2002.

The album was released on 28 January 2002 in the UK, following the release of the single "It Began in Afrika", a variation of the band's "Electronic Battle Weapon 5", which was released in September 2001 and appears on the album, as well as the release of the single "Star Guitar". Both tracks were successful in the charts, both reaching number 8 on the UK Singles Chart. The album itself entered at number 1, being their third consecutive number 1 album. As well as the two singles released before the album, "Galaxy Bounce" appears on the album, made famous on the Lara Croft: Tomb Raider soundtrack in Summer 2001.

In its opening week on the Billboard chart it sold 30,000 copies.

Singles and EPs
"It Began in Afrika" was released in June 2001 as "Electronic Battle Weapon 5" exclusively for DJs to test in clubs. It was officially issued as the first single on 10 September 2001 and reached number eight on the UK Singles Chart. The version on the album is a six-minute version that segues into the popular "Galaxy Bounce". "Star Guitar" was released on 14 January 2002 and reached number eight on the UK Singles Chart. "Come with Us" and "The Test" were released as a double A-side single on 22 April 2002. It reached number 14 on the UK Singles Chart. In Japan, the names in the title of the single were reversed. "Hoops" was released on 1 June 2002 in remixed form as "Electronic Battle Weapon 6", exclusively for DJs to test in clubs.

At the time of their touring in Japan, the tie-in extended play titled Come with Us/Japan Only EP was released exclusively to Japan on 17 July 2002. Its lead song is "Come with Us". The AmericanEP was released exclusively to America on 19 November 2002 in promotion of the North Amerika tour. Its lead song is a variation of "Star Guitar". "Come with Us" and "The Test" were also issued as separate promo singles in addition to the retail double A-side.

Reception

Initial critical response to Come with Us was generally positive. At Metacritic, which assigns a normalised rating out of 100 to reviews from mainstream critics, the album has received an average score of 72, based on 23 reviews. Kludge included it on their list of best albums of 2002.

Andy Puleston of the BBC said that "years ago Tom and Ed assured us 'the brother's gonna work it out'. If you've ever felt that they had yet to make good on this promise then, as far as Come With Us is concerned there was never a truer word spoken." His review also acknowledged the success of "It Began in Afrika", saying that by "removing shrubs, laying concrete and generally paving the way for this album, "Afrika" conquered Ibiza, Notting Hill Carnival and contrived a craving amongst those with an affinity for a big, bouncy kick drum."

AllMusic said that "After forgetting the key on 1999's Surrender amidst handling all of the celebrity guests, they got back to business with Come With Us", and that "from the vocal sample introducing the opener ("behold...they're coming back"), it's clear Rowlands and Simons know the importance of this fourth album, and it detonates like a bomb blast, as though the duo knew that Come With Us had to be bigger and badder than all the bombastic breaks they'd dropped in the past."

Following the album's release, the band embarked on two tours in promotion of the album, the Go with Them tour and the North Amerika tour.

Track listing

As with all other albums by The Chemical Brothers, some of the tracks segue into the next. These are 2 into 3, and 7 into 8.

Personnel
 The Chemical Brothers – production

Additional musicians
 Jared Faber – drums ("Come with Us")
 Steve Dub – engineering, additional guitar
 Greg Fleming – assistance
 Kate Gibb – artwork
 Beverley Skeete – vocals on "Star Guitar"
 Richard Ashcroft – vocals on "The Test"
 Beth Orton – vocals on "The State We're In"
 Shovell – percussion on "It Began in Afrika"

Charts

Weekly charts

Year-end charts

Certifications

Release history

References

2002 albums
The Chemical Brothers albums
Astralwerks albums
Virgin Records albums